Herman Smith is the name of:

 Herman Smith (gridiron football) (born 1971), American former gridiron football player 
 Herman L. Smith (1892–1950), American mathematician
 Herman Smith, real name of the Wizard of Oz in The Wiz
 Herman Smith, namesake of the Smith-Harris House
 Red Smith (coach), (1906–1959), American football, baseball, and track coach

See also
 Herman Smith-Johannsen (1875–1987), supercentarian